Meyqan (also Romanized as Meyqān, Mīqān, and Mīyqān; also known as Maīghan) is a village in Miqan Rural District, in the Central District of Arak County, Markazi Province, Iran. At the 2006 census, its population was 396, in 127 families.

References 

Populated places in Arak County